Blanche Kommerell (born 10 March 1950) is a German actress and writer. She has appeared in more than fifty films since 1962. She was a daughter of actress Ruth Kommerell.

Selected filmography

References

External links
 

1950 births
Living people
People from Halle (Saale)
German film actresses
German television actresses